Danka Barteková (born 19 October 1984) is a Slovak skeet shooter. She has won many medals from ISSF World, European Championships and ISSF World Cups. Barteková finished 8th at Women's Skeet event at the 2008 Summer Olympics and won the bronze medal in Women's Skeet at the 2012 Summer Olympics. She also competed in the 2016 Summer Olympics. Barteková is a 14-time gold medalist in the Slovak Championship since 1999.

In 2012, she was elected to the IOC Athletes' Commission. Barteková served as an IOC member from 2012 to 2021, and was also vice-chair of the IOC Athletes' Commission from 2018 to 2021. In February 2022 she was elected to serve an eight-year term as a member of the International Olympic Committee.

Achievements
 Won a bronze medal at the 2012 London Olympics
 In the ISSF World Shooting Championships, Danka earned one silver medal in the SK75 event in 2001 and five bronze medals in SK75 event in 2003, 2005, 2006, 2010 and 2014.
 Bagged four gold medals (2006, 2009, 2012, 2014), three silver medals (2008, 2008, 2012) and three bronze medals (2006, 2011, 2020, 2021) at the ISSF World Cup
 Secured a silver medal at the 2011 Universiade
 Won a gold medal in SK75 event at the 2012 ISSF World Cup Final
 Claimed six gold medals in SK75 & SK125W event at the European Championships in the years 2002, 2004, 2008, 2010, 2018 and 2019
 Also added one silver medal in 2015 and two bronze medals under her belt at the European Championships in 2013 and 2014

References

External links

 
 Danka Bartekova – Shooting – Olympic Athlete  London 2012 

1984 births
Living people
Slovak female sport shooters
Olympic shooters of Slovakia
Shooters at the 2008 Summer Olympics
Shooters at the 2012 Summer Olympics
Shooters at the 2016 Summer Olympics
International Olympic Committee members
World Anti-Doping Agency members
Olympic bronze medalists for Slovakia
Olympic medalists in shooting
Medalists at the 2012 Summer Olympics
European Games competitors for Slovakia
Shooters at the 2015 European Games
Universiade medalists in shooting
Universiade silver medalists for Slovakia
Shooters at the 2019 European Games
Shooters at the 2020 Summer Olympics
Sportspeople from Trenčín